The Kagisano–Molopo Local Municipality is a Local Municipality in the North West Province in South Africa. It was formed in 2011 by the merger of the Kagisano and Molopo Local Municipalities. The council consists of twenty-nine members elected by mixed-member proportional representation. Fifteen councillors are elected by first-past-the-post voting in fifteen wards, while the remaining fourteen are chosen from party lists so that the total number of party representatives is proportional to the number of votes received. In the election of 1 November 2021 the African National Congress (ANC) won a majority of twenty seats.

Results 
The following table shows the composition of the council after past elections.

May 2011 election

The following table shows the results of the 2011 election.

August 2016 election

The following table shows the results of the 2016 election.

November 2021 election

The following table shows the results of the 2021 election.

References

Municipal elections in South Africa